The Prosecutions Division (刑事檢控科) of the Department of Justice, is the public prosecution office in Hong Kong led by the Director of Public Prosecutions. The Prosecutions Division is the largest in the Department, with about 125 lawyers, known as 'Public Prosecutors', and about 115 lay prosecutors, known as 'Court Prosecutors'. The role of the Division is to prosecute trials and appeals on behalf of Hong Kong, to provide legal advice to law enforcement agencies upon their investigations, and generally to exercise on behalf of the Secretary for Justice the discretion of whether or not to bring criminal proceedings in Hong Kong. In addition, counsel in the Division provide advice and assistance to Government bureaux and departments in relation to any criminal law aspects of proposed legislation.

The lawyers of the Prosecution Division in the former British Hong Kong colonial administration were, before 1997, titled "Crown Counsel"(檢察官). After the transfer of sovereignty of Hong Kong, they were renamed "Government Counsel" (政府律師). In 2007, to highlight their constitutional independence, lawyers working in the Prosecutions Division adopted the alternative title of "Public Prosecutor" (檢控官).

Structure 
The Division is headed by a Director, who is supported by five Deputy Directors of Public Prosecutions (DDPP) in charge of different sub-divisions:

 Sub-division I (Advisory): Responsible for cases in the Court of First Instance, District Court, and Magistrates' Court
 Sub-division II (Policy and Administration / Chief of Staff): Responsible for providing advice to other government departments and a wide range of administrative matters, including human resources, training, and media relations
 Sub-division III (Advocacy and Appeals): Responsible for advocacy work on all levels, and are also responsible for advising and conducting appeals
 Sub-division IV (Commercial Crime): Responsible for prosecuting all instances of commercial crime
 Special Duties: Responsible for ad hoc large scale projects as directed by the DPP, as well as certain public-order crime and cybercrime

One Deputy Director sub-division will also be designated as Chief of Staff; currently, this is with Sub-division II.

Directors of Public Prosecutions 
For more information on the position and for a more detailed list, please see Director of Public Prosecutions (Hong Kong)

 Peter Nguyen SBS QC SC (1997)
 Grenville Cross SBS QC SC (1997–2009)
 Ian McWalters SC (2009–2011)
 Kevin Zervos SC (2011–2013)
 Keith Yeung SC (2013–2017)
David Leung SC (2017–2020)
Maggie Yang (2021–present)

References 

Prosecution
Law enforcement agencies of Hong Kong